The Sikorsky H-19 Chickasaw (company model number S-55) was a multi-purpose helicopter used by the United States Army and United States Air Force. It was also license-built by Westland Aircraft as the Westland Whirlwind in the United Kingdom. United States Navy and United States Coast Guard models were designated HO4S, while those of the U.S. Marine Corps were designated HRS. In 1962, the U.S. Navy, U.S. Coast Guard and U.S. Marine Corps versions were all redesignated as H-19s like their U.S. Army and U.S. Air Force counterparts.

Development
Development of the H-19 was initiated privately by Sikorsky without government sponsorship. The helicopter was initially designed as a testbed for several novel design concepts intended to provide greater load-carrying ability in combination with easy maintenance. Under the leadership of designer Edward F. Katzenberger, a mockup was designed and fabricated in less than one year.

The first customer was the United States Air Force, which ordered five YH-19 aircraft for evaluation; the YH-19's first flight was on 10 November 1949, less than a year after the program start date. This was followed by delivery of the first YH-19 to the U.S. Air Force on 16 April 1950 and delivery of the first HO4S-1 helicopter to the U. S. Navy on 31 August 1950. A U.S. Air Force YH-19 was sent to Korea for service trials in March 1951, where it was joined by a second YH-19 in September 1951. On 27 April 1951, the first HRS-1 was delivered to the U.S. Marine Corps, and on 2 May 1951, the first S-55 was delivered to Westland Aircraft.

1,281 of the helicopters were manufactured by Sikorsky in the United States. An additional 447 were manufactured by licensees of the helicopter including Westland Aircraft, SNCASE in France and Mitsubishi in Japan.

The helicopter was widely exported, used by many other nations, including Portugal, Greece, Israel, Chile, South Africa, Denmark and Turkey.

In 1954 the Marines tested an idea to enhance lift in hot-and-high and/or heavily loaded conditions by installing a rocket nozzle at the tip of each rotor blade with the fuel tank located in the center above the rotor blade hub. Enough fuel was provided for seven minutes of operation. Although tests of the system were considered successful, it was never adopted operationally.

Design

These features yielded an aircraft that was far more capable in a transport role than previous Sikorsky designs.

The forward engine location placed the main cabin essentially in line with the main rotor's rotational axis and close to the aircraft center of gravity, making it easier to maintain proper weight and balance under differing loading conditions. The impetus for this design choice was the recent rejection of the Sikorsky XHJS by the U.S. Navy in favor of the tandem rotor Piasecki HUP Retriever; the Navy had strongly objected to the necessity to use ballast in the cabin-forward XHJS to maintain proper weight and balance, prompting Sikorsky to seek single-rotor design alternatives that did not require this.

Another benefit of this engine location was ease of maintenance, as the engine could be readily accessed at ground level through dual clamshell-style doors; the entire engine could be changed in only two hours, and the radial engine was oriented backwards relative to a typical airplane installation, allowing more convenient access to engine accessories.

The offset flapping hinges and hydraulic servos gave more positive flight control under differing loading conditions, isolated the flight controls from vibration, and lessened control forces; the H-19 could be flown with only two fingers on the cyclic control.

The YH-19 prototypes featured a blunt aft fuselage and a single starboard-mounted horizontal tailplane with a small vertical fin at its outboard end. Initial production models added a large fillet-like fin behind the fuselage and under the tailboom, and the tailplane configuration was changed to an inverted "V" shape.

However, the HO4S was deemed underpowered in U.S. Navy service with this powerplant, so the aircraft was re-engined with a  Wright R-1300-3 radial which the U.S. Navy found to be adequate in an air–sea rescue role; the H-19B, HO4S-3, HRS-3, and subsequent models would use this powerplant. The R-1300 models also used a single horizontal tailplane in place of the early inverted "V" style, and a new hydro-mechanical clutch gave smoother and more rapid rotor acceleration during clutch engagement and allowed the engine to be started and operated at any speed while disengaged from the transmission and rotors.

Early civilian and military S-55 models offered a folding  capacity hoist above the starboard main cabin door, while later models could be equipped with a more capable and reliable  capacity unit. Starting with the introduction of the S-55C in October 1956, the tailboom was inclined three degrees downward to provide more main rotor clearance during hard landings; models equipped with the inclined tail also used an  tail rotor in place of the earlier  unit.

Operational history

The H-19 Chickasaw holds the distinction of being the U.S. Army's first true transport helicopter and, as such, played an important role in the initial formulation of Army doctrine regarding air mobility and the battlefield employment of troop-carrying helicopters. The H-19 underwent live service tests in the hands of the 6th Transportation Company, during the Korean War beginning in 1951 as an unarmed transport helicopter. Undergoing tests such as medical evacuation, tactical control and frontline cargo support, the helicopter succeeded admirably in surpassing the capabilities of the H-5 Dragonfly which had been used throughout the war by the Army.

The U.S. Marine Corps made extensive use of the H-19 in the Korean War. It was designated as the HRS in USMC service. Marine Squadron HMR-161 arrived in Korea on 2 September 1951 with 15 HRS-1 helicopters. The new helicopter squadron started operations upon arrival. On 13 September 1951, during Operation Windmill I, HMR-161 transported  of gear and 74 Marines onto a ridge in the Punchbowl area. Their performance continued to improve and in Operation Haylift II on 23–27 February 1953, HMR-161 lifted  of cargo to resupply two regiments. Although HMR-161 helicopters were operating in hot landing zones they did not lose any helicopters to enemy fire. HRS-1 helicopters were also used to relocate rocket launcher batteries. Because rockets create much visible dust when fired they make an easy target for enemy artillery. To reduce their exposure, launchers and crews were moved twice a day. Each HRS-1 helicopter carried four rocket launchers and extra rockets as external cargo, with the crew in the cabin. The HRS-1 helicopter proved to be durable and reliable in Korean service. One reportedly flew home after losing  of main rotor blade to a tree. HMR-161 reported 90% aircraft availability.

The U.S. Air Force ordered 50 H-19A's for rescue duties in 1951. These aircraft were the primary rescue and medical evacuation helicopters for the USAF during the Korean War. The Air Force continued to use the H-19 through the 1960s, ultimately acquiring 270 of the H-19B model.

On 1 September 1953, Sabena used the S-55 to inaugurate the first commercial helicopter service in Europe, with routes between Rotterdam and Maastricht in the Netherlands and Cologne and Bonn in Germany.

France made aggressive use of helicopters in Algeria, both as troop transports and gunships, Piasecki/Vertol H-21 and Sud-built Sikorski H-34 helicopters rapidly displaced fixed-wing aircraft for the transport of paras and quick-reaction commando teams. In Indochina, a small number of Hiller H-23s and Sikorsky H-19s were available for casualty evacuation. In 1956, the French Air Force experimented with arming the H-19, then being superseded in service by the more capable Piasecki H-21 and Sikorsky H-34 helicopters. The H-19 was originally fitted with a 20 mm cannon, two rocket launchers, two 12.7 mm machine guns, and a 7.5 mm light machine gun firing from the cabin windows, but this load proved far too heavy, and even lightly armed H-19 gunships fitted with flexible machine guns for self-defense proved underpowered.

The H-19 was also used by the French forces in the First Indochina War. A small number of war-worn H-19s were given to the Republic of Vietnam Air Force in 1958, when the French military departed. These saw very limited service in the early days of the Vietnam War, before being supplanted by the more capable Sikorsky H-34 Choctaw.

The H-19 left U.S. military service when the CH-19E was retired by U.S. Navy squadron HC-5 on 26 February 1969. Surplus H-19s were sold on the open market, and civil interest was sufficient that Sikorsky (and later Orlando Helicopter Airways) offered conversion kits allowing a military surplus H-19 to be commercially operated under a standard Federal Aviation Administration type certificate as an S-55B. Turboshaft conversions were also offered by aftermarket modification companies.

A novel civil conversion of the H-19 by Orlando Helicopter was the Heli-Camper, a campervan-like conversion—featuring a built-in mini-kitchen and sleeping accommodations for four. In the late 1970s, Orlando participated in a joint effort with popular American recreational vehicle (RV) manufacturer Winnebago Industries to market the aircraft, now renamed the Winnebago Heli-Home. A larger version based on the Sikorsky S-58 was also developed, and optional floats were offered for amphibious operations. The aircraft were featured in several American popular magazines and reportedly drew large crowds at RV shows and dealerships, but their high purchase price together with rising 1970s fuel prices resulted in very limited sales; production is not well documented, but is estimated at only six or seven of the S-55 and S-58 versions combined.

Variants

YH-19 Five early production S-55s for evaluation
H-19A USAF version of the YH-19 powered by a  R-1340-57 engine, redesignated UH-19A in 1962, 50 built.
SH-19A H-19As modified for air-sea rescue, redesignated HH-19A in 1962.
H-19B H-19A with a more powerful  R-1300-3 engine, redesignated UH-19B in 1962, 264 built.
SH-19B H-19Bs modified for air-sea rescue, redesignated HH-19B in 1962.
H-19C U.S. Army version of the H-19A, redesignated UH-19C in 1962, 72 built.
H-19D U.S. Army version of the H-19B, redesignated UH-19D in 1962, 301 built.
HO4S-1 U.S. Navy version of the H-19A, ten built.
HO4S-2G United States Coast Guard version of HO4S-2, seven built.
HO4S-3 Re-engined U.S. Navy & Canadian version with  Wright R-1300-3 engine, U.S. Navy aircraft redesignated UH-19F in 1962 (RCN/CAF aircraft retained HO4S-3 designation), 79 built.
HO4S-3G United States Coast Guard version of the HO4S-3, redesignated HH-19G in 1962, 30 built.
HRS-1 United States Marine Corps version of the HO4S for eight troops,  R-1340-57 engine, 60 built.
HRS-2 HRS-1 with equipment changes, 101 built.
HRS-3 HRS-2 with  R-1300-3 engine, became CH-19E in 1962, 105 built and conversions from HRS-2.
HRS-4 Project for HRS-3 with a  R-1820 radial engine, not built.
UH-19A H-19A redesignated in 1962.
HH-19A SH-19A redesignated in 1962.
UH-19B H-19B redesignated in 1962.
HH-19B SH-19B redesignated in 1962.
CH-19E HRS-3 redesignated in 1962.
UH-19F HO4S-3 redesignated in 1962.
HH-19G HO4S-3G redesignated in 1962
S-55 Commercial version with  R-1340 engine.
S-55A Commercial version with  R-1300-3 engine.
S-55B New designation given to civilian kit conversions of military surplus H-19s with R-1300-3 engine.
S-55C S-55A with a  R-1340 engine.
S-55T Aircraft modified by Aviation Specialties and produced and marketed by Helitec with a  Garrett AiResearch TPE-331-3U-303 turboshaft and updated equipment.
S-55QT Commercial conversion. Ultra-quiet helicopter for sight-seeing flights over the Grand Canyon.
OHA-S-55 Heli-Camper/Winnebago Heli-Home Commercial conversions carried out by Orlando Helicopters; marketed by Winnebago.
OHA-S-55 Nite-Writer Commercial conversion. Aerial advertising helicopter, fitted with a 12.2 m × (40 ft × 8 ft) array of computer-controlled lights.
OHA-S-55 Bearcat Commercial conversion. Agricultural helicopter.
OHA-S-55 Heavy Lift Commercial conversion. Flying crane helicopter.
QS-55 Aggressors Commercial conversion. S-55 helicopters converted into flying targets.
OHA-AT-55 Defender Commercial conversion. Armed military helicopter.
Whirlwind HAR21 HRS-2 for Royal Navy, ten delivered.
Whirlwind HAS22 HO4S-3 for Royal Navy, 15 delivered. Later marks of Whirlwind were built under licence.
VAT Elite Highly modified S-55 from Vertical Aircraft Technologies Inc., powered by a  Garret TSE311 driving a 5-bladed rotor.

Operators

Notable accidents
 17 January 1975 – In what remains the deadliest helicopter accident in Icelandic history, an S-55B crashed in Hvalfjörður, Iceland due to severe winds, killing all five passengers and both crewmembers on board.

Aircraft on display
See Westland Whirlwind (helicopter) for examples of the British license-built S-55.

Argentina
 H-04 – S-55 on display at the Museo Nacional de Aeronáutica de Argentina in Morón, Buenos Aires.
 0371/55-633 – S-55 on display at the Museo de la Aviacion Naval in Bahia Blanca, Buenos Aires.

Guatemala
 S-55 on display in the traffic circle at the main gate of Air Force Headquarters, Aeropuerto Internacional La Aurora, Guatemala City.

Canada
 55885 – HO4S-3 on static display at the Shearwater Aviation Museum in Shearwater, Nova Scotia. It is painted in Royal Canadian Navy Sqn. No. 7 colors as used by Anti-Submarine Squadron HS-50 and Utility Squadron HU-21.
 55822 Sikorsky S-55 Horse (H-19, HO4S) on static display at The Hangar Flight Museum in Calgary, Alberta, was operated by Associated Airways in Canada's north. It is fitted with a 550 hp Pratt & Whitney Wasp R-1340-S1H2 engine.

Denmark
 S-884 – S-55C on static display at the Danmarks Flymuseum in Skjern, Ringkøbing-Skjern.

Germany
 53-4458 – H-19B on static display at the Deutsches Museum in Munich, Bavaria.

India
 IZ1590 – S-55C on static display at the Indian Air Force Museum in Palam, Delhi.

Israel
 03 – H-19 on static display at the Israeli Air Force Museum in Hatzerim, South District.

Japan
 JG-0001 – H-19C on static display at the Tokorozawa Aviation Museum in Tokorozawa, Saitama.
 40012 – H-19C in storage at the Kawaguchiko Motor Museum in Narusawa, Yamanashi.

Norway
 56-4279 – H-19 D-4 on static display at the Norwegian Armed Forces Aircraft Collection in Gardermoen, Akershus.

Portugal
 9101 – UH-19 at the Museu do Ar on Sintra Air Base near Lisbon.

Serbia
 11714 – S-55 on static display at the Museum of Aviation in Surčin, Belgrade.

Thailand
 H3-3/97 – Type 3 on display at the Royal Thai Air Force Museum in Bangkok, Bangkok.

Turkey
 52-7577 – UH-19B on static display at the Istanbul Aviation Museum in Istanbul, Istanbul.

United States
 Unknown ID – H-19 in storage at Fantasy of Flight in Polk City, Florida.
 Unknown ID – UH-19F on static display at Kirtland Air Force Base in Albuquerque, New Mexico.
 130151 – CH-19E on static display at the National Museum of Naval Aviation in Pensacola, Florida. It is displayed in a US Coast Guard paint scheme.
 130252 – HRS-3 on static display at the Flying Leatherneck Aviation Museum in San Diego, California. It is painted with the unit markings of HMR-161.
 49-2012 – YH-19 on static display at the Udvar-Hazy Center of the National Air and Space Museum in Chantilly, Virginia. This airframe was the first S-55 built.
 52-7537 – UH-19B on static display at the Pima Air and Space Museum in Tucson, Arizona. It is painted as a rescue helicopter with the 534th Air Defense Group.
 52-7587 – UH-19 on static display at the National Museum of the United States Air Force in Dayton, Ohio. It is painted as Hopalong, one of the helicopters to make the first transatlantic flight.
 52-7602 – H-19D on static display at the Evergreen Aviation & Space Museum in McMinnville, Oregon. It is painted in U.S. Army scheme.
 53-4426 – H-19B on static display at the Strategic Air Command & Aerospace Museum in Ashland, Nebraska.
 55-4943 – UH-19D on static display at the Estrella Warbird Museum in Paso Robles, California. This airframe had previously been on display at the Museum of Flight in Seattle, Washington.
 57-5937 – UH-19D on static display at the Valiant Air Command Warbird Museum in Titusville, Florida. It is painted in a USAF rescue scheme. It was previously on display at the EAA AirVenture Museum in Oshkosh, Wisconsin. This aircraft is a former Winnebago Heli-Home.
 59-4973 – UH-19D on static display at the Camp San Luis Obispo Museum and Historical Site in San Luis Obispo, California.
 53221 – H-19 Chickasaw on static display at the United States Army Aviation Museum at Fort Rucker, Alabama.

Specifications (UH-19C)

Notable appearances in media

See also

References

Notes

Citations

Bibliography
Duke, R.A., Helicopter Operations in Algeria [Trans. French], Dept. of the Army (1959)

France, Operations Research Group, Report of the Operations Research Mission on H-21 Helicopter Dept. of the Army (1957)
Harding, Stephen. U.S. Army Aircraft Since 1947, Shrewsbury, UK: Airlife Publishing (1990). .
Riley, David, French Helicopter Operations in Algeria, Marine Corps Gazette, February 1958, pp. 21–26.
Shrader, Charles R., The First Helicopter War: Logistics and Mobility in Algeria, 1954–1962, Westport, Connecticut: Praeger Publishers (1999)

Spenser, Jay P., Whirlybirds: A History of the U.S. Helicopter Pioneers, Seattle, Washington: University of Washington Press (1998)

Further reading

External links

H-19 US Army Aviation history fact sheet
H-19 Chickasaw on GlobalSecuity.org
USMC Sikorsky HRS (H-19) Database
HELIS.com Sikorsky S-55 (H-19/HRS/HO4S) Database

United States military helicopters
H-19, Sikorsky
Search and rescue helicopters
1940s United States helicopters
H-019
Single-engined piston helicopters
Aircraft first flown in 1949